The Victoria Hotel is located on Stirling Terrace in Toodyay, Western Australia. It was classified by the National Trust of Australia in 1977 and added to the Register of National Estates in 1980.

History
The village of Toodyay was established in 1836 and in 1864 George Hasell constructed a single storey building here for James Thomas Woods. The bricks were made at the riverside and the lime was carried from Clackline. Woods ran a store on the site and obtained a storekeeper's gallon licence. In 1875 Woods added eight rooms to the store  and from 1880 provided a venue for dances in the "long room". In 1882 Woods applied for a Billiard and Bagatelle License. In 1888 Woods converted the store into a licensed premises, which he called the Victoria Hotel.

In 1892 Charles Corpaccioli leased the Victoria Hotel from J.T. Woods for a yearly rental of £100.  In 1894 the first annual dinner of the Toodyay Vine and Fruitgrowers’ Association overtaxed the capacity of the dining room when 60-70 gentlemen sat down for a meal and "over a score were unable to find seats". Also in January 1894 ice cream was introduced at the hotel.

In 1896 James Butler was the licensee followed by John F Cavanah in 1897.  In March 1898 the Northam Advertiser mentions bricks being on site for extensions to the hotel.   In September 1899 the same newspaper also noted a billiard room adjoining the hotel (now evolved into the present day Victoria Billiard Saloon) was nearing completion.  It was positioned behind a hairdresser and a second shop being enlarged for a jeweller.

In December 1900 Mr J Cavanah died  and his widow M.H. Cavanah became the proprietress of the hotel.  In September 1902 she married Frederick George Ashbourne Treadgold who became the licensee in 1902.

In January 1903 the Victoria Hotel was the only hotel in town with ice. In late 1903 a tender was accepted for the erection of a second storey and other improvements. Mr Treadgold was given permission to erect a balcony over the footpath in front of the hotel. The second storey was completed in 1904.

In 1906 Thomas John Donegan had taken over management of the Victoria Hotel and in 1908 an extension added the western section of the building. The cordials and aerated waters required for the hotel were manufactured on the premises. 
Before World War I the hotel was the rendezvous of the local volunteer Light Horse Regiment. In 1935 Patrick (Paddy) Andrew Connolly, James Ryan and Sydney Herbert Reidy-Crofts bought the hotel from Donegan.

In March 1937 Mr EJ Parker (aged 37) became the licensee managing the hotel on behalf of the Avon Brewery Company. A few months later on 16 July, Parker fled the hotel with all his belongings, having stolen more than £90.  He left an apologetic note behind in the safe, posting the safe keys back from Melbourne by air mail. The safe had already been drilled open by the time the keys arrived. Parker was tracked down quickly at Burnie, Tasmania on 6 August. He was brought back to Western Australia to face charges of "stealing as a servant", to which he admitted his guilt in September.

In 1937 repairs and renovations were undertaken by the architectural firm Cavanagh, Cavanagh and Allom. In May 1939 "excellent cuisine and garage space" were being advertised as being available  and by June hot water had been installed.  From August to October 1941 the weekly tariff was advertised as £2/2/-.

In 1946 Leslie Bartlett purchased the property and carried out further renovations, including adding a beer garden in the 1950s. More alterations were made in the 1970s including renovating the Billiard Saloon and incorporating it into the hotel as a lounge. Renovations in 2018 included a rear extension and new kitchen. Today the upper storey of the building has an enclosed balustrade while the ground floor has an open verandah.

References 

Buildings and structures in Toodyay, Western Australia
Hotels in Western Australia
Stirling Terrace, Toodyay
Western Australian places listed on the defunct Register of the National Estate